Silverwell is a hamlet in Cornwall, England, United Kingdom. It is between Three Burrows and Coldharbour and southeast of Goonbell.

References

Hamlets in Cornwall